Air Raid is a fixed shooter video game published by Small System Software for the TRS-80 Level I or II in 1978. It is an adaptation of the game TARGET, developed for the Sol-20 by Steve Dompier.

Gameplay

The player uses a five direction missile launcher to destroy a random sequence of small quickly moving and large slowly moving aircraft (represented by ASCII characters) crossing the screen at seven altitudes. Collisions between two aircraft destroy both and produce a higher scoring parachute target, while aircraft destroyed by missiles explode, producing a cloud of debris capable of destroying aircraft below.

Reception
Joseph T. Suchar reviewed Air Raid in The Space Gamer No. 30. Suchar commented that "Air Raid is the best arcade-type game I have played. As an arcade game it is unsurpassed and I recommend it."

References

External links

1978 video games
Fixed shooters
TRS-80 games
TRS-80-only games
Video game clones
Video games developed in the United States